Finland was represented by Riki Sorsa and the song "Reggae OK" at the 1981 Eurovision Song Contest, which took place on 4 April in Dublin. Sorsa won the rights to represent Finland on the 21 February.

Before Eurovision

National final 
The final was hosted by Finnish television producer and singer Erkki Pohjanheimo, at Yleisradio Studio 2 in Helsinki. Eight songs were selected from the semi-final which took place on January 28. The winning song was selected by a national jury, two of which included former Finnish Eurovision contestants Marion Rung and Lasse Mårtenson.

At Eurovision
On the night Sorsa performed eighth (following Yugoslavia and preceding France). For the first time in 15 years regular Finnish conductor Ossi Runne did not conduct the Finnish entry (instead he was providing the YLE television commentary) and was instead conducted by Otto Donner. At the close of voting "Reggae OK" had picked up 27 points, placing Finland in 16th place out of 20. The Finnish jury awarded its 12 points to Switzerland.

Voting

References

External links
  Finland's national final

1981
Countries in the Eurovision Song Contest 1981
Eurovision
Eurovision